Shariatpur Government College is a degree college in the Dhanuka area of the town of Shariatpur, headquarters of Shariatpur District, Bangladesh. Founded in 1978, it is a government college. This college started at the intermediate level. It later developed to the degree, honours and masters level and provides some honours level courses.

History
On 9 June 1978, this college was established by the then sub-divisional commissioner Md. Aminur Rahman and 1 March 1980, the college was nationalized. In the academic year 1998–1999, the doors of higher education in Shariatpur district were opened with the introduction of honors courses in political science and management at Shariatpur Government College. Shariatpur College students from remote areas, since its inception has played a leading role in higher education.

Departments
The college has the following nine departments:
 Department of Marketing
 Department of Accounting
 Department of Bengali
 Department of Chemistry
 Department of Economics
 Department of English
 Department of Management
 Department of Mathematics
 Department of Physics
 Department of Political Science

References

External links
 

Universities and colleges in Bangladesh
Universities and colleges in Shariatpur
1978 establishments in Bangladesh